The Yamaha TT-R230 is a trail bike that Yamaha produced from 2005–present. The TT-R230 is Yamaha's successor to the TT-R225.  The names TT, TT-R, and XT have been used for semi off-road and street versions in different markets and in different eras. The TT-R230 is a mid-range dirt bike for beginner to intermediate riders, kids or teen. It is mainly used for family recreation and off-road trails. It has a soft suspension, wide seat and high ground clearance.

See also
 Yamaha TT-R125
 Yamaha TT-R225
 Yamaha TT-R250
 Yamaha XT225
 Yamaha TTR 230

References

External links
 

TTR230